The  is a local railway line in Iwate Prefecture, Japan, operated by the East Japan Railway Company (JR East). It originally connected Ichinoseki Station in Ichinoseki to Sakari Station in Ōfunato, on the Tohoku coast.

The eastern section of the line was significantly damaged by the 2011 Tōhoku earthquake and tsunami on 11 March 2011. In January 2012, services resumed on the western 62.0 km (38.5 mi) portion of the route between Ichinoseki and Kesennuma. The eastern section between Kesennuma and Sakari remains closed, and in February 2012, JR East officially proposed that this section of the line be scrapped and the right-of-way used as a bus rapid transit (BRT) route. The section was routinely replaced by BRT, and this section of the line was formally closed as a railway on 1 April 2020.

The line connects with the Kesennuma Line at Kesennuma Station and formerly connected with the privately owned Sanriku Railway's Minami-Riasu Line at Sakari Station in Ōfunato.

History
The Ichinoseki – Kesennuma section opened in stages between 1925 and 1929, with the Kesennuma – Sakari section opening between 1932 and 1935.

Freight services ceased in 1983/4.

Following the 2011 disaster, services resumed on the Ichinoseki – Kesennuma section on 1 April, but were suspended again between 7–18 April due to aftershocks.

The first section of the busway replacing the Kesennuma – Sakari section opened in March 2013.

Operations
In April 2005, there were 27 services daily using this line (14 eastbound, 13 westbound).

Following the 2011 disaster, operations were reduced to ten eastbound local trains and one Super Dragon rapid service, with westbound services consisting of nine local trains and one rapid. In March 2013 the rapid services were withdrawn.

On 22 December 2012, a special Pokémon With You train began running on the line. The train operates on selected days, departing eastbound at 11:01am and returning westbound at 2:37pm. The train stops at most stations on the way for between six and thirteen minutes. All seats are reserved and a seat fee is payable in addition to the basic fare.

Station list
Stations in greyed out cells have been closed since the 2011 Tōhoku earthquake and tsunami.

References
This article incorporates material from the corresponding article in the Japanese Wikipedia

External links

Article on Tohoku railways Link is broken

 
Lines of East Japan Railway Company
Rail transport in Iwate Prefecture
Rail transport in Miyagi Prefecture
1067 mm gauge railways in Japan
Railway lines opened in 1925
1925 establishments in Japan
Bus rapid transit in Japan